The National Basketball Association (NBA) is a men's professional basketball league in North America. This list comprises all Italian players who have played in the NBA since its foundation in 1946. Each player's entry includes the seasons he spent in the league, the teams he played for, the number of appearances he made (both in regular season and playoffs) and his draft information. The list also includes players who were born outside of Italy but hold Italian citizenship or have represented the Italian national team in FIBA-sanctioned competitions, as well as Italian-born players who acquired another nationality at some point. Players who were born in Italy to foreign parents and never held Italian citizenship are not included.

By the aforementioned criteria, 11 Italian players have played in the NBA. The first Italian-born player to feature in the league was Hank Biasatti, who appeared in six games for the Toronto Huskies during the 1946–47 season and subsequently was picked by the Boston Celtics in the 1947 draft; Biasatti, however, was a Canadian citizen by naturalization at the time of his debut, having moved to Canada with his parents as a child. In the 1970 draft, Dino Meneghin was selected as an 11th round pick by the Atlanta Hawks, thus becoming the first Italian- and European-raised player to be drafted by an NBA team; nonetheless, Meneghin was never signed. In 1989, Mike D'Antoni became the first player with NBA experience to represent Italy in international competitions, being selected to the Italian squad for the European Championship; an American citizen by birth, D'Antoni had been playing in the Italian League for 12 years and had been granted Italian citizenship due to his Italian ancestry. On November 12, 1995, Stefano Rusconi became the first Italian-raised player to play in the NBA, as he made his debut for the Phoenix Suns. In the 2006 draft, Andrea Bargnani was selected by the Toronto Raptors as the first overall pick, being the first—and to date only—Italian and European player to be drafted first overall.

Marco Belinelli is currently the all-time leader among Italians in both regular season and playoff games played, with 860 and 65 respectively. Belinelli was also the first Italian to both play in the NBA Finals and win an NBA Championship, having done so as a member of the San Antonio Spurs in 2014.

Key

Players 

Other draftees 
The following players were drafted but either never played or have yet to play in the NBA.

Notes

See also 
List of foreign NBA players

References

External links 
NBA & ABA Players Born in Italy at basketball-reference.com

Nba